The Islamic Republic of Iran's International Holy Quran Competition is the international Islamic Quran reading event that has been held annually since 1982 in Iran.

History
The program was started on 5 February 1982 and 12 countries, such as Malaysia, Bangladesh, India, Iraq, Syria, Guinea, Algeria and Libya took part in the competition. It was held in Hosseiniyeh Ershad, Tehran. The competition takes place each year, in the lunar month of Rajab, and is sponsored by the country’s Awqaf and Charity Affairs Organization.

For many years, this competition was held in Hosseiniyeh Ershad.
The 2nd competition took place from 1 to 6 April 1983 and women, for the first time, participated in the competition.

Quran reciters and memorizers from various Muslim and non-Muslim countries attend the week-long international Quranic event.

Subjects
Originally, the competition consisted of two subjects, memorization of the entire Quran and Tahqiq recitation of the Quran. Now it consists of three changing subjects.

References 

Islam in Iran
Quran reciting
Annual events in Iran
Quranic studies